Taghi Akbari (born 1945) is an Iranian former tennis player.

Career
Akbari was a member of Iran Davis Cup team from 1958 to 1975, where he was captain since 1974. He appeared at 15 Davis Cup campaigns for Iran, which is a national record. His 17 singles wins is also an Iranian Davis Cup record, that was equaled by Anoosha Shahgholi in 2011. He also won three doubles rubbers during his career. 

In 1962 he was a qurter finalkist at the Lebanon International Championships. His only career singles title win came at the Lebanese National Championships held in Brummana, Lebanon in 1965. In 1966 he reached the quarter finals of the Philippines Championships.

He won a bronze medal in the men's singles event at the 1966 Asian Games and a silver medal at the 1974 Asian Games, where he lost in the gold medal playoff to Toshiro Sakai. In 1966 he was a semi finalist at the Iranian International Championships in Tehran where he lost to Bob Hewitt. 

Akbari managed to qualify for the 1967 Wimbledon Championships but was beaten by Sergei Likhachev in the first round. He is the first Iranian Tennis player who played at Roland Garros without having had to play any qualification rounds. He competed in the 1969 French Open and lost again in the opening round, but did manage to take Phil Dent into a fifth set. His brother, Mohammad Hossein Akbari, also played in the 1969 French Open. The same year he reached the quarter finals of the All India Hard Court  Championships.

Akbari received Davis Cup Commitment Award for his 15 years honorific representing his country in Davis Cup.

He is Iran's all-time highest ranked player, with a ranking of 146 (3 June 1974).

References

Asian Games bronze medalists for Iran
Asian Games medalists in tennis
Asian Games silver medalists for Iran
Iranian male tennis players
Living people
1945 births
Tennis players at the 1966 Asian Games
Tennis players at the 1974 Asian Games
Medalists at the 1966 Asian Games
Medalists at the 1974 Asian Games
Sportspeople from Tehran